Frank de Kova (March 17, 1910 – October 15, 1981) was an American character actor in films, stage, and TV.

Biography
De Kova was born in New York City. He was a teacher at a school in New York before joining a Shakespeare repertory group. He made his Broadway debut in Detective Story, and was discovered by director Elia Kazan.

Moving to Hollywood, he appeared in Viva Zapata! (1952) as the Mexican Colonel, and The Big Sky (1952) with Kirk Douglas. He played Abiram in The Ten Commandments, appeared in Cowboy (1958) with Glenn Ford and Jack Lemmon, and in The Mechanic (1972) with Charles Bronson and Jan-Michael Vincent and the Ralph Bakshi film American Pop.
 
He did much television work, including a role as Mafia hitman Jimmy Napoli in the ABC crime drama The Untouchables, and an occasional recurring role in Gunsmoke as "Tobeel", a Kiowa Indian who is a friend of Marshal Matt Dillon. His best-known television role was as "Chief Wild Eagle", chief of the Hekawi tribe, on the western comedy F Troop (1965–1967). He also guest-starred in the ABC/Warner Brothers drama,  The Roaring 20s. He appeared as Phil Kalama in "Along Came Joey" on Hawaii Five-O in 1968.

In 1981, de Kova died of heart failure in his sleep at his home in North Hills, California. He is interred at Forest Lawn Memorial Park in Hollywood Hills, California.

Films

Television

References

External links
 
 
 

1910 births
1981 deaths
20th-century American male actors
American male film actors
American male stage actors
American male television actors
American male voice actors
American people of Italian descent
Burials at Forest Lawn Memorial Park (Hollywood Hills)
Male Western (genre) film actors
Male actors from Los Angeles
Male actors from New York City
People from North Hills, Los Angeles
Western (genre) television actors